This is a list of the mammal species recorded in Denmark, listing only species found outside captivity and fenced enclosures, or with certain records younger than 1000 A.D. The main source is the most recent atlas survey of mammals in Denmark. The atlas records 88 mammal species in Denmark. Since the atlas was published in 2007, three new species have been recorded in the country: the grey wolf, golden jackal and Cuvier's beaked whale.

The following tags are used to highlight each species' conservation status in the most current version of the Danish Red List. Assessments were made following recommendations of the International Union for Conservation of Nature.

Eulipotyphlans

Erinaceidae (hedgehogs) 
 West European hedgehog, Erinaceus europaeus LC

Talpidae (moles) 
 European mole, Talpa europaea LC

Soricidae (shrews)
 Eurasian water shrew, Neomys fodiens NT
 Common shrew, Sorex araneus LC
 Eurasian pygmy shrew, Sorex minutus LC

Bats

Vespertilionidae (evening bats) 
Western barbastelle, Barbastella barbastellus NT
 Serotine bat, Eptesicus serotinus LC
 Northern bat, Eptesicus nilssonii DD
 Bechstein's bat, Myotis bechsteinii EN
 Brandt's bat, Myotis brandti NT
 Pond bat, Myotis dasycneme VU
 Daubenton's bat, Myotis daubentonii LC
 Greater mouse-eared bat, Myotis myotis NA
 Whiskered bat, Myotis mystacinus VU
 Natterer's bat, Myotis nattereri NT
 Common noctule, Nyctalus noctula LC
 Lesser noctule, Nyctalus leisleri DD
 Nathusius's pipistrelle, Pipistrellus nathusii LC
 Common pipistrelle, Pipistrellus pipistrellus LC
 Soprano pipistrelle, Pipistrellus pygmaeus LC
 Brown long-eared bat, Plecotus auritus LC
 Parti-coloured bat, Vespertilio murinus LC

Lagomorphs

European rabbit, Oryctolagus cuniculus NA
European hare, Lepus europaeus LC

Rodents

Sciuridae (squirrels) 
 Red squirrel, Sciurus vulgaris LC
 Siberian chipmunk, Eutamias sibiricus NA introduced

Castoridae (beavers)
 Eurasian beaver, Castor fiber EN

Gliridae (dormice) 
 Garden dormouse, Eliomys quercinus DD
 Hazel dormouse, Muscardinus avellanarius EN

Cricetidae (voles) 
 Water vole, Arvicola terrestris LC
 Bank vole, Myodes glareolus LC
 Field vole, Microtus agrestis LC
 Common vole, Microtus arvalis LC
 Muskrat, Ondatra zibethicus NA introduced

Muridae 
 Yellow-necked mouse, Apodemus flavicollis LC
 Striped field mouse, Apodemus agrarius LC
 Wood mouse, Apodemus sylvaticus NT
 Harvest mouse, Micromys minutus LC
 Brown rat, Rattus norvegigus NA
 House mouse, Mus musculus NT
 Black rat, Rattus rattus RE

Dipodidae 
 Northern birch mouse, Sicista betulina VU

Myocastoridae 
 Coypu, Myocastor coypus NA introduced

Carnivorans

Canidae (dogs, foxes) 

 Golden jackal, Canis aureus NA vagrant
 Grey wolf, Canis lupus VU
 Raccoon dog, Nyctereutes procyonoides NA introduced
 Red fox, Vulpes vulpes NT

Procyonidae (raccoons and relatives) 
 Raccoon, Procyon lotor NA introduced

Mustelidae (mustelids) 
 European otter, Lutra lutra VU
 Beech marten, Martes foina NT
 Pine marten, Martes martes NT
 European badger, Meles meles LC
 Stoat, Mustela erminea NT
 Least weasel, Mustela nivalis NT
 European polecat, Mustela putorius NT
 American mink, Neogale vison NA introduced

Odobenidae 
 Walrus, Odobenus rosmarus NA vagrant

Phocidae (earless seals) 
 Hooded seal, Cystophora cristata NA vagrant
 Common seal, Phoca vitulina LC
 Ringed seal, Pusa hispida NA vagrant
 Grey seal, Halichoerus grypus VU
 Harp seal, Pagophilus groenlandicus NA vagrant

Cetacea

Balaenopteridae 
 Blue whale, Balaenoptera musculus NA vagrant
 Sei whale, Balaenoptera borealis NA vagrant
 Bryde's whale, Balaenoptera edeni NA vagrant
 Fin whale, Balaenoptera physalus NA 
 Common minke whale, Balaenoptera acutorostrata LC 
 Humpback whale, Megaptera novaeangliae NA vagrant

Phocoenidae (porpoises) 
 Harbour porpoise, Phocoena phocoena LC

Monodontidae 
 Beluga, Delphinapterus leucas NA vagrant

Physeteridae (sperm whales)
 Sperm whale, Physeter macrocephalus NA

Ziphidae (beaked whales) 
 Sowerby's beaked whale, Mesoplodon bidens NA vagrant
 Northern bottlenose whale, Hyperoodon ampullatus NA vagrant
 Cuvier's beaked whale, Ziphius cavirostris NA vagrant

Delphinidae 
 White-beaked dolphin, Lagenorhynchus albirostris LC
 Atlantic white-sided dolphin, Lagenorhynchus acutus NA
Short-beaked common dolphin, Delphinus delphis NA
 Striped dolphin, Sternella coeruleoalba NA vagrant
 Bottlenose dolphin, Tursiops truncatus NA
 Risso's dolphin, Grampus griseus NA vagrant
 False killer whale, Pseudorca crassidens NA vagrant
 Long-finned pilot whale, Globicephala melas NA
 Killer whale, Orcinus orca NA

Even-toed ungulates

Suidae (pigs) 
 Wild boar, Sus scrofa CR

Cervidae (deer) 
 Eurasian elk Alces alces NA vagrant
 Roe deer, Capreolus capreolus LC
 Red deer, Cervus elaphus LC
 Sika deer, Cervus nippon NA introduced
 European fallow deer, Dama dama NA introduced

References

Denmark
Mammals
Mammals
Denmark